Clethra acuminata, the mountain pepper bush, is a shrub native to the Appalachian Mountains of the southeastern United States.

It has acuminate leaves with teeth along the margins, and solitary white flowers.

It should be grown in moist soil, and has been marked as a pollinator plant, supporting and attracting hummingbirds, butterflies, and honeybees.

References

acuminata
Flora of the Southeastern United States
Flora of the Appalachian Mountains
Taxa named by André Michaux